There are at least 20 named lakes and reservoirs in Benton County, Arkansas.

Lakes
According to the United States Geological Survey, there are no named lakes in Benton County.

Reservoirs
Beaver Lake, el.  
Bella Vista Lake, el.  
Crystal Lake, el.  
Guerrero Lake Number One, el.  
Guerrero Lake Number Three, el.  
Gurrero Lake Number Two, el.  
Jackson Lake, el.  
Lake Ann, el.  
Lake Atalanta, el.  
Lake Avalon, el.  
Lake Bentonville, el.  
Lake Brittany, el.  
Lake Flint Creek, el.  
Lake Frances, el.  
Lake Keith, el.  
Lake Norwood, el.  
Lake Rayburn, el.  
Lake Windsor, el.  
Siloam Springs Lake, el.  
Upper Pond, el.

See also
 List of lakes in Arkansas

Notes

Bodies of water of Benton County, Arkansas
Benton